Henry Norman Marrett (born 15 December 1879 in Umballa) was a male badminton player from England.

Marrett won the All England Open Badminton Championships, considered the unofficial World Badminton Championships, in men's singles in 1904, 1905 and 1908.

He married fellow badminton player Florence Lannowe.

References

All England champions 1899-2007

English male badminton players
1879 births
1961 deaths